Leighton James (born 16 February 1953 in Loughor, Swansea, Wales) is a former Wales international footballer.

Playing career
James started his career as a left winger with Burnley, making his league debut in November 1970 against Nottingham Forest.

In 1971, he won his first international cap against Czechoslovakia. Altogether, he played 54 times for Wales and scored 10 goals.

In 1975, he signed for Derby County for a then club record fee of £310,000, and in 1977 joined Queens Park Rangers in exchange for Don Masson. He made his QPR debut against WBA in October 1977 and went on to play 28 league games, scoring 4 goals.

In 1978, he returned to play with Burnley but left when they were relegated to the third division and signed for Swansea City, helping them from the third division to the first. He had spells with Sunderland, Bury and Newport County before in 1986 he returned to Burnley for a third spell, as youth team manager and occasional player. He retired from playing in 1989 after being sacked as youth team manager.

Managerial career
James became a coach at Bradford City before succeeding Gary Simpson as manager of Gainsborough Trinity in October 1993. He was the manager at Morecambe but was sacked after only 5 months in charge. In October 1995 he was appointed manager of Southern League Premier Division side Ilkeston Town. After winning his first three matches in charge, the team then went 20 games without a victory and James left the club in February 1996 to be replaced by Keith Alexander. On 29 September 1997, James took over from Tony Greenwood as manager of Accrington Stanley. He spent five months in charge at the Crown Ground before resigning in February 1998 due to other work commitments.

James also had two spells in charge of League of Wales club Llanelli, who he saw relegated in 2002–03. In 2001–02 he coached Garden Village of the Welsh Football League to the Second Division championship title with a final day victory at Chepstow Town.

He currently works as a football pundit for BBC radio and television along with a regular programme on Real Radio. The BBC suspended James for a period due to controversial remarks made in a regular newspaper column regarding Cardiff City.

In December 2009, James was appointed manager of Welsh Football League Division One side Aberaman Athletic.

He was appointed as Director of Football at Welsh Football League Division One side Haverfordwest County in 2011 but resigned after less than 2 months.

Personal life 
James' personal life has not been without controversy. In June 2007, the BBC reported that he was given a driving ban for driving while one and a half times over the legal alcohol limit.

He caused further controversy in March 2008 by commenting in his column in the South Wales Evening Post that he would like Cardiff City to lose to Barnsley FC in the FA Cup semi-final 2008. Although the rivalry between the football clubs of Swansea and Cardiff is well documented, James' comments angered some because of his supposed impartiality as a pundit, and also for his staunch attitude that Welsh people should support Welsh teams in whatever sport, an opinion he has discussed at length on radio phone in programmes. As punishment for his comments, the BBC saw fit to ban James from appearing on their programmes for two weeks. James returned on 26 April 2008 to the Wales on Saturday programme.

James' comments about Cardiff City were the subject of the song, "Leighton James Don't Like Us", recorded by Cardiff musician Leigh Bailey.

Away from football, in June 2007 James was named Rookie Lollipop Man of the Year by Swansea Councilfor Penyrheol Primary School, which his nephew Thomas James went to.

James is also a rugby fan, and often comments on rugby on the Real Radio sports phone in. He is an avid supporter of Scarlets.

References 

1953 births
Living people
Welsh footballers
Wales international footballers
Wales under-23 international footballers
Footballers from Swansea
Burnley F.C. players
Bury F.C. players
Derby County F.C. players
Cymru Premier managers
Newport County A.F.C. players
Queens Park Rangers F.C. players
Swansea City A.F.C. players
Sunderland A.F.C. players
English Football League players
Gainsborough Trinity F.C. managers
Morecambe F.C. managers
Accrington Stanley F.C. managers
Ilkeston Town F.C. managers
Bradford City A.F.C. non-playing staff
Llanelli Town A.F.C. managers
Burnley F.C. non-playing staff
Association football wingers
People educated at Gowerton Grammar School
Welsh football managers
Garden Village A.F.C. managers
Haverfordwest County A.F.C. managers